is a former Japanese football player. He played for Japan national team.

Club career
Okimune was born in Hiroshima Prefecture on September 7, 1959. After graduating from high school, he joined Japan Soccer League Division 1 club Kawasaki Frontale in 1978. However, in first season, the club was relegated to Division 2.

National team career
In August 1979, Okimune was selected Japan U-20 national team for 1979 World Youth Championship. He played 3 games. On August 30, 1981, he debuted for Japan national team against Malaysia. He played 2 games for Japan in 1981.

National team statistics

References

External links
 
 
 Japan National Football Team Database

1959 births
Living people
Association football people from Hiroshima Prefecture
Japanese footballers
Japan youth international footballers
Japan international footballers
Japan Soccer League players
Kawasaki Frontale players
Association football defenders